The 1909 Holy Cross football team was an American football team that represented the College of the Holy Cross in the 1909 college football season.

In its third year under head coach Timothy F. Larkin, the team compiled a 2–4–2 record. Edward F. Sweeney was the team captain.

Holy Cross played its home games at Fitton Field on the college campus in Worcester, Massachusetts.

Schedule

References

Holy Cross
Holy Cross Crusaders football seasons
Holy Cross football